Copaifera officinalis, the copaiba balsam, is a species of flowering plant in the family Fabaceae, native to Bolivia, Brazil, and Venezuela. It has been introduced to Cuba, the Dominican Republic, Trinidad and Tobago, Sierra Leone, India, and Sri Lanka. Like other members of its genus, its trunks are tapped for its oleoresin, sometimes termed balsam of copaiba or, when refined, copaiba oil, which has industrial, artisanal, and medicinal purposes. Its oleoresin exhibits better bactericidal activity against common pathogens than that of Copaifera langsdorffii.

References

officinalis
Flora of Bolivia
Flora of Northeast Brazil
Flora of Venezuela
Plants described in 1762
Taxa named by Carl Linnaeus